In the mathematical theory of functions of one or more complex variables, and also in complex algebraic geometry, a biholomorphism or biholomorphic function is a bijective holomorphic function whose inverse is also holomorphic.

Formal definition
Formally, a biholomorphic function is a function  defined on an open subset U of the -dimensional complex space Cn with values in Cn which is holomorphic  and one-to-one, such that its image is an open set  in Cn and the inverse  is also holomorphic. More generally, U and V can be complex manifolds. As in the case of functions of a single complex variable, a sufficient condition for a holomorphic map to be biholomorphic onto its image is that the map is injective, in which case the inverse is also holomorphic (e.g., see Gunning 1990, Theorem I.11).

If there exists a biholomorphism , we say that U and V are biholomorphically equivalent or that they are biholomorphic.

Riemann mapping theorem and generalizations
If  every simply connected open set other than the whole complex plane is biholomorphic to the unit disc (this is the Riemann mapping theorem). The situation is very different in higher dimensions. For example, open unit balls and open unit polydiscs are not biholomorphically equivalent for  In fact, there does not exist even a proper holomorphic function from one to the other.

Alternative definitions
In the case of maps f : U → C defined on an open subset U of the complex plane C, some authors (e.g., Freitag 2009, Definition IV.4.1) define a conformal map to be an injective map with nonzero derivative i.e., f’(z)≠ 0 for every z in U. According to this definition, a map f : U → C is conformal if and only if f: U → f(U) is biholomorphic.  Other authors (e.g., Conway 1978) define a conformal map as one with nonzero derivative, without requiring that the map be injective. According to this weaker definition of conformality, a conformal map need not be biholomorphic even though it is locally biholomorphic. For example, if f: U → U is defined by f(z) = z2 with U = C–{0}, then f is conformal on U, since its derivative f’(z) = 2z ≠ 0, but it is not biholomorphic, since it is 2-1.

References
 
 
 
 
 

Several complex variables
Algebraic geometry
Complex manifolds
Functions and mappings